Palicourea is a plant genus in the family Rubiaceae. It contains about 200 species, which range from shrubs to small trees, and is distributed throughout the New World tropics.

These plants are closely related to Psychotria and in particular its subgenus Heteropsychotria. Indeed, it seems to be nothing else but a distinctively-flowered offshoot of Heteropsychotria; arguably, it would thus need to be merged into Psychotria to make that genus monophyletic. On the other hand, Psychotria is extremely diverse already, so it is probably more practical to move the more distantly related species out of this genus and merge Heteropsychotria with Palicourea. By a Hungarian botanist Attila Borhidi, some of the Psychotria species have been transferred into this genus.

The genus is not well studied. Most species are distylous, although a few on isolated Caribbean islands seem to have lost the trait.  Flowers are in racemes, having no scent, and are normally pollinated by hummingbirds.  Blue-black berries follow, and are thought to be distributed by birds.

Almost one-tenth of the Palicourea species are considered threatened by the IUCN, even though the conservation status has only been reviewed for those species that occur in Ecuador.

Selected species
 Palicourea anderssoniana
 Palicourea anianguana
 Palicourea asplundii
 Palicourea azurea
 Palicourea calantha
 Palicourea calothyrsus
 Palicourea calycina
 Palicourea canarina
 Palicourea candida
 Palicourea consobrina
 Palicourea corniculata
 Palicourea cornigera
 Palicourea elata (syn. Psychotria elata)
 Palicourea fuchsioides
 Palicourea gentryi
 Palicourea heilbornii
 Palicourea herrerae
 Palicourea holmgrenii
 Palicourea jaramilloi
 Palicourea lasiantha
 Palicourea lasiorrhachis
 Palicourea latifolia
 Palicourea lobbii
 Palicourea macrocalyx
 Palicourea microcarpa (Ruiz & Pav.) Zappi
 Palicourea padifolia
 Palicourea prodiga
 Palicourea sodiroi
 Palicourea stenosepala
 Palicourea subalatoides
 Palicourea tectoneura
 Palicourea tomentosa (syn. Psychotria poeppigiana)
 Palicourea wilesii

References

Further reading 
  (2008): [www.iucnredlist.org 2008 IUCN Red List of Threatened Species].
  (2008): Palicourea Aubl. (Rubiaceae: Psychotrieae). Version of 2008-APR-04. Retrieved 2008-DEC-21.

 
Rubiaceae genera
Taxonomy articles created by Polbot